Gulcz  is a village in the administrative district of Gmina Wieleń, within Czarnków-Trzcianka County, Greater Poland Voivodeship, in west-central Poland.

The village has an approximate population of 600.

Twin towns – sister cities

Gulcz is twinned with:

 Stevens Point, USA

References

Gulcz